İsmail Galib was the son of İbrahim Edhem Pasha  and a notable numismatist in the Ottoman Empire, studying coins from the Sultanate of Rum. He is considered the father of modern numismatics in Turkey.

Works 

Takvîm-i Meskükât-ı Selçukiye. (Catalogue of Seljuq Coins)
Takvîm-i Meskükât-ı Osmaniyye. (Catalogue of Ottoman Coins)

References 

Turkish numismatists
19th-century people from the Ottoman Empire